Jerry Berndt (May 11, 1938 – December 3, 2022) was an American football player, coach, and college athletics administrator.  He served as the head football coach at DePauw University, the University of Pennsylvania, Rice University, and Temple University. In two years at DePauw (1979–1980), Berndt guided the Tigers to a 9–9–1 mark, including a 7–2–1 mark in his second season. From 1981 to 1985, he coached at Penn and compiled a 29–18–2 record. In 1984, he won Ivy League Coach of the Year honors. From 1986 to 1988, he coached at Rice, and compiled a 6–27 record. This included an 0–11 season in 1988. From 1989 to 1992, he coached at Temple, where he compiled an 11–33 record. He also served as the offensive coordinator and quarterbacks coach at the University of Missouri from 1994 to 1999. He played college football at Bowling Green State University.

Berndt died on December 3, 2022, aged 84.

Coaching career
Berndt began his coaching career in the high school football ranks in 1962.  He was an assistant at Libbey High School in Toledo, Ohio and at Bedford High School in Temperance, Michigan.  In 1969, he worked a graduate assistant at the University of Toledo under head coach Frank Lauterbur.  The next year Berndt served as the head football coach at Streetsboro High School in Streetsboro, Ohio.  From 1971 to 1978 he was an assistant football coach at Dartmouth College.

Head coaching record

College

References

1938 births
2022 deaths
American men's basketball players
Bowling Green Falcons football players
Dartmouth Big Green football coaches
DePauw Tigers football coaches
Missouri Tigers football coaches
Penn Quakers football coaches
Rice Owls athletic directors
Rice Owls football coaches
Temple Owls football coaches
Toledo Rockets football coaches
Wisconsin–Superior Yellowjackets baseball players
Wisconsin–Superior Yellowjackets football players
Wisconsin–Superior Yellowjackets men's basketball players
Wisconsin–Superior Yellowjackets wrestlers
College men's tennis players in the United States
High school football coaches in Ohio